Hal "Coach" Hilpirt (August 9, 1908 – September 16, 1998) was born in Aurora, Missouri. He was an American football player who played college football for Oklahoma City University, and professionally for the New York Giants (1930–1931), Chicago Cardinals (1931–1932), and the Cincinnati Football Reds (1933). He was part of the beginnings of the modern era of American professional football and made a major impact as a baseball coach in Jackson County, Oklahoma winning 3 championships between 1945-1951.

Playing career
Hilpirt was drafted out of Oklahoma City University by the New York Football Giants where he played right end, and was a substitute for Glenn "Rex" Campbell. He started 2 games that year while the Giants went 13-4, finishing second in the league to the Green Bay Packers.

He played 2 more seasons with the Cardinals and the Reds, retiring from professional football in 1933.

Commonly misspelled as Hal Hilpert.

Coaching career
In 1945, Hilpirt was responsible for the organization of the Junior America Legion Baseball Association in Jackson County, Oklahoma coaching championship teams in 1945, 1948 & 1951.  He also coached at Capitol, Foster, Altus and Snider High Schools in Oklahoma before moving to Irving, Texas.

References

 Dallas Morning News Obituary Section, September 19, 1998

External links
 https://www.pro-football-reference.com/players/H/HilpHa20.htm

1908 births
1998 deaths
People from Aurora, Missouri
American football defensive ends
New York Giants players
Chicago Cardinals players
Cincinnati Reds (NFL) players
Oklahoma City Chiefs football players
Players of American football from Missouri